Patkar Varde College is an educational institution located in Goregaon (West), Mumbai, India. It is also known as Chikitsak Samuha's S.S. & L.S. Patkar College of Arts & Science, and V. P. Varde College of Commerce & Economics.

The college was established in 1964, and has various aided and self-financed courses at the Junior, Under-graduate, and Post-graduate levels, along with Diploma and Certificate courses.

Facilities
The College Gymkhana provides installations for sports such as table tennis, football, chess, carrom and boxing.
It also has its own computer lab for conducting practical lectures for the students.

Course details

B.Sc. (Bachelor of Science)
Duration : 3 Years
Fee: visit site 
Study Mode :Regular
B.Com. (Bachelor of Commerce)
Duration : 3 Years
Study Mode :Regular
B.A. (Bachelor of Arts)
Duration : 3 Years
Study Mode :Regular
Junior College (FYJC & SYJC)
Duration : 2 Years
Study Mode :Regular

References

External links

Universities and colleges in Mumbai
Educational institutions established in 1964
Colleges in India
1964 establishments in Maharashtra